Waterproof fabrics are fabrics that are, inherently, or have been treated to become, resistant to penetration by water and wetting. The term "waterproof" refers to conformance to a governing specification and specific conditions of a laboratory test method. They are usually natural or synthetic fabrics that are laminated or coated with a waterproofing material such as rubber, polyvinyl chloride (PVC), polyurethane (PU), silicone elastomer, fluoropolymers, and wax. Treatment could be either of the fabric during manufacture or of completed products after manufacture, for instance by a waterproofing spray. Examples include the rubberized fabric used in Mackintosh jackets, sauna suits and inflatable boats.

Definition and specifications

Waterproof/breathable fabrics resist liquid water passing through, but allow water vapour to pass through. Their ability to block out rain and snow while allowing vapour from sweat to evaporate leads to their use in rainwear, waterproof outdoor sports clothing, tents, and other applications.

Standard laboratory testing protocols  define the performance of these fabrics. Water resistance is measured by the amount of water, in mm, which can be suspended above the fabric before water seeps through. Breathability or Moisture vapor transmission rate is measured by the rate at which water vapor passes through, in grams of water vapour per square meter of fabric per 24-hour period (g/m2/d), often abbreviated to just "g". In recent years  some, but not all, sporting goods manufacturers have begun including this information on their product labels. Typical mid-range fabrics tend to have values of 5,000 mm of water resistance and 5,000 g of breathability; the best materials have 20,000 mm and 20,000 g.

One specific definition of "waterproof/breathable" requires the fabric to withstand a pressure of over 1,000 millimetres of water (9.8 kPa) pressure without leaking (see hydrostatic head).

These values should be taken with some caveats. Rain room tests show that some fabrics with less than 1,000 mm of water resistance keep water out sufficiently for practical purposes. Garments made from these fabrics tested in the Leeds University Rain Room show no signs of leakage after 4 hours of simulated rain five times heavier than heavy rain. However, some garments made from fabrics that exceed 20 000 mm have leaked through zips, hoods, and seams. Fabric head ratings do not totally specify water resistance of a garment, as it does not test closures such as zips. In addition, the breathability of nearly all waterproof/breathable fabrics is very dependent upon weather conditions, especially temperature, humidity and wind.

Directional fabrics 
Fabric construction which directs water away from the body, rather than membranes, coatings or laminates, can be used to keep the wearer dry. This means that perspiration can be moved away from the body more effectively, as both liquid water and water vapour can be directed. These are directional fabrics such as Nikwax Analogy and FurTech, which are also breathable in the conventional sense (although these examples are actually a combination of two different fabrics, a directional "pump" layer underneath a distinct windproof and water resistant outer layer, and while effectively completely waterproof against rain they would fail a strict hydrostatic head test as given in the definition above).

In combination with thermal insulation 
Garments that combine waterproofing with some thermal insulation, such as those manufactured by FurTech and Nikwax Analogy, resist cold bridging, heat transferred through layers of poorly-thermally-insulating materials in close contact that would be prevented by a small airspace. When there is cold bridging, vapour on the dry side can condense on the cold surface, making it appear that the thin waterproof breathable fabric has leaked.

See also
 Durable water repellent
 Layered clothing
 Sauna suit
 Waterproofing
 Hipora
 Gore-Tex
 Ventile
 Nikwax Analogy

References

External links 
 "Breathability" comparison of commercial outerwear shell layers, Phil Gibson, 2000, Materials Science Team, United States Army Soldier Systems Center
 Water Resistant vs Waterproof – What’s the Difference? Allthingswaterproof.com Article 2016

Technical fabrics